Zamarramala is a village in the municipality of Segovia, Castile and León, Spain. It stands above its surroundings and can be seen from Segovia proper. In the past, it had its own town hall, but it became part of Segovia in the 1970s.

Fiesta de Santa Águeda
Zamarramala is known for its Fiesta de Santa Águeda, declared a Fiesta of National Tourist Interest 
() in 1972.

References

Towns in Spain
Populated places in the Province of Segovia